Kirov (masculine) or Kirova (feminine or masculine genitive) is the name of several inhabited localities in Russia.

Urban localities
Kirov, Kirov Oblast, a city and the administrative center of Kirov Oblast
Kirov, Kaluga Oblast, a town in Kaluga Oblast

Rural localities
Kirov, Republic of Adygea, a khutor in Shovgenovsky District of the Republic of Adygea
Kirov, Bryansk Oblast, a settlement in Klintsovsky District of Bryansk Oblast
Kirov, name of several other rural localities
Kirova, Republic of Bashkortostan, a khutor in Kugarchinsky District of the Republic of Bashkortostan
Kirova, Volgograd Oblast, a settlement in Svetloyarsky District of Volgograd Oblast
Kirova, Yaroslavl Oblast, a settlement in Rybinsky District of Yaroslavl Oblast
Kirov, Sakha Republic, a selo in Nyurbinsky District of the Sakha Republic

See also
imeni Kirova, Russia, name of several rural localities in Russia

ca:Kírov (Rússia)